Gray's Anatomy for Students is an anatomy textbook inspired by the famous Gray's Anatomy (Grey's Anatomy) and aimed primarily at medical students. The textbook has been praised for its innovative illustration style, which emphasizes clarity and a conceptual approach to learning. The text aims to display the basic concepts for chiropractic, dental, medical, and physical therapy students.

Gray's Anatomy was used as the major reference, both for the text and the illustrations.

References

Anatomy books
Gray's Anatomy
Medical manuals
Medical students
2004 books